

Season summary
Dortmund retained their title with a comfortable six-point lead over runners-up Bayern Munich.

Players

First team squad
Squad at end of season

Left club during season

Borussia Dortmund II

Competitions

Bundesliga

League table

References

Notes

Borussia Dortmund seasons
Borussia Dortmund
German football championship-winning seasons